The 2019–20 season is Eastern's 65th season in the top-tier division in Hong Kong football. Eastern will compete in the Premier League, Senior Challenge Shield, FA Cup and Sapling Cup this season.

Squad

First Team
As of 1 June 2020

 FP

 FP

 FP

 FP

 FP

Remarks:
FP These players are registered as foreign players.
LP These players are registered as local players in Hong Kong domestic football competitions.

Transfers

Transfers in

Transfers out

Loans Out

Club officials

Competitions

Hong Kong Premier League

Table

Hong Kong Senior Challenge Shield

Hong Kong Sapling Cup

Group stage

Hong Kong FA Cup

Remarks

References

Eastern Sports Club seasons

Hong Kong football clubs 2019–20 season